Sligo Intermediate Football Championship is an annual second tier Gaelic Athletic Association competition between Gaelic football clubs organised by Sligo GAA. The winning club qualifies to represent its GAA county in the Connacht Intermediate Club Football Championship and, in turn, goes on to the All-Ireland Intermediate Club Football Championship.

Qualification for subsequent competitions

Connacht Intermediate Club Football Championship
The Sligo IFC winners qualify for the Connacht Intermediate Club Football Championship. It is the only team from County Sligo to qualify for this competition. The Sligo IFC winners enter the Connacht Intermediate Club Football Championship at the quarter-final stage. For example, 2012 winner Bunninadden played in the Connacht IFC final. This was the first since 2004 winner Calry/St Joseph played in the Connacht IFC final.

All-Ireland Intermediate Club Football Championship
The Sligo IFC winners — by winning the Connacht Intermediate Club Football Championship — may qualify for the All-Ireland Intermediate Club Football Championship, at which they would enter at the semi-final stage, providing they haven't been drawn to face the British champions in the quarter-finals.

Trophy
The trophy presented to the winning team is the Joe McMorrow Cup.

Roll of honour

 - Eastern Harps' second team contested the finals of 2003 and 2005.

List of finals

Further reading
 Sligo GAA 125 History (2010)

References

External links
Official Sligo Website
Sligo on Hoganstand
Sligo Club GAA

 
2
Intermediate Gaelic football county championships